António Lebo Lebo  (born 29 May 1977) is an Angolan former footballer. Lebo Lebo ended his career with Recreativo do Libolo in the Angolan league.

International career
Lebo Lebo was a member of the Angola national team, and was called up to the 2006 FIFA World Cup.

References

External links
 

1977 births
Living people
Angolan footballers
Angola international footballers
2006 FIFA World Cup players
2006 Africa Cup of Nations players
Footballers from Malanje
Atlético Petróleos de Luanda players
Association football midfielders
Association football fullbacks